Bathybuccinum is a genus of sea snails, marine gastropod mollusks in the family Buccinidae, the true whelks.

Species
Species within the genus Bathybuccinum include:
 Bathybuccinum bicordatum Golikov & Sirenko, 1988
 Bathybuccinum clarki Kantor & Harasewych, 1998
 Bathybuccinum higuchii Fraussen & Chino, 2009
 Bathybuccinum unicordatum Golikov & Sirenko, 1988
 Bathybuccinum yadai Fraussen & Chino, 2009

References

External links

Buccinidae
Gastropod genera